Thames Valley Tigers was a British professional basketball team that competed in the British Basketball League (BBL) until 2005, when funding was ceased and the franchise folded. Based in Bracknell, Berkshire, the team's fans set up a new team to replace the Tigers and a month later the Guildford Heat was born. Playing in the nearby town of Guildford, at the Spectrum complex, the team started the 2005–06 British Basketball League season with many of the former Tigers players.

Franchise history
The franchise originally started out as the Southern Pirates, playing out of the city of Portsmouth, however they were soon moved inland in 1975 to the town of Guildford, following their coach, Brian Naysmith who had been appointed Director of Sport at the University of Surrey. The name Southern Pirates was retained at first before being renamed Guildford Pirates. In the 1978–79 season Guildford Pirates were champions of the Second Division of the National Basketball League and accepted an invitation to join the top tier.  Known as Team Talbot Guildford Pirates following a sponsorship deal, the franchise spent three seasons in Guildford. The team struggled in NBL Division 1, although they improved each year.  The Junior (U-18) Men were more successful winning the National (U-18) Cup.

In 1982, the Pirates moved again to nearby Bracknell, becoming the Bracknell Pirates and notching the franchise its first winning season and Play-Off appearances.  In 1987 the Bracknell Tigers joined the BBL and won the first silverware in 1988–89 before becoming the Thames Valley Tigers. For many years, the Tigers were one of the front runners of the league, even winning the League Championship in 1994, but it was in the new millennium that the successes dried up and for owner John Nike the team was too much of a financial burden. In April 2005, he announced that he would no longer be funding the basketball franchise nor his ice hockey franchise Bracknell Bees.

Immediately a consortium of fans was formed to save the club, headed by local businessman and fan Mike Davies, and they put together a viable package to take over the administration of the team. However, Nike failed to reach agreement in time for them to lease the franchise, and the deadline for entry into the BBL for 2005–06 was reached. The Tigers' BBL membership thus lapsed, but the fans obtained permission from the League to enter a new team in their place, and successful negotiations with the Spectrum Arena in Guildford, where the Pirates franchise started, led to the birth of the brand new Guildford Heat.

Honours 
(All achieved as Thames Valley Tigers unless otherwise stated):

Senior Men

BBL League Champions: 1993–94     
Runner Up: 1991–92, 1992–93, 1994–95, 1999–00 (South)
BBL Play-offs Runner Up: 1991–92, 1992–93, 1997–98, 1998–99
National Cup Winners: 1988–89 (as Bracknell Tigers) 1997–98     
Runner Up: 1991–92, 1993–94, 1994–95
BBL National Trophy Winners: 1988–89 (as Bracknell Tigers), 1992–93, 1993–94, 1994–95
English National League Division 2  Champions: 1978–79 (as Guildford Pirates)

Junior (Under-18) Men

National Cup Winners: 1981–82 (as Team Talbot Guildford Pirates)
National Under-18 League Play-offs Runner Up: 1981–82 (as Team Talbot Guildford Pirates)

Individual Honours

Mick Bett - BBL Coach of the Year: 1992–93 and 1993–94
Nigel Lloyd - BBL MVP: 1993–94

Season by season

See also
Bracknell Bees
British Basketball League
Guildford Heat

Notes

Defunct basketball teams in the United Kingdom
Basketball teams established in 1975
Basketball teams disestablished in 2005
Sport in Bracknell
Former British Basketball League teams
1975 establishments in England
2005 disestablishments in England
Sport in Guildford